2K10 may refer to:

 the year 2010
 Major League Baseball 2K10, 2010 video game
 NBA 2K10, 2009 video game
 NHL 2K10, 2009 video game
 Y2K+10, a nickname for the Year 2010 problem in computing